Phiaris metallicana is a species of moth belonging to the family Tortricidae.

It is native to Eurasia and Northern America.

References

Olethreutini
Moths described in 1799